The women's pole vault event at the 1997 Summer Universiade was held at the Stadio Cibali in Catania, Italy on 27 and 29 August. This was the first time that this event was contested at the Universiade.

Medalists

Results

Qualification

Final

References

IAAF 1997 ranking

Athletics at the 1997 Summer Universiade
1997 in women's athletics
1997